The Yellow Line of Namma Metro is under construction and will form part of the metro rail network for the city of Bangalore, Karnataka, India. The 18.82 km line connects R.V. Road with Bommasandra and is fully elevated with 16 stations. R.V. Road station is the terminal station on city side where an interchange is being provided with the Green Line. Jayadeva Hospital station will, in future serve as another interchange station with the Pink Line that is also under construction in Phase ll of Namma Metro's expansion. Silkboard station will be another interchange station between Yellow Line and Blue Line. The other end of Yellow Line was initially planned to terminate at Bommasandra but on 9 June 2022, the Karnataka government gave approval for the extension of this line from Bommasandra to Hosur in Tamil Nadu.

Planning
Namma Metro's Phase ll includes two new lines - Yellow and Pink Lines, as well as extensions of Purple Line and Green Line. Phase II spans a length of 72.095 km (13.79 km underground, 0.48 km at grade and 57.825 km elevated) and adds 61 stations to the network of which 12 are underground.

Tenders for the construction of Yellow Line (between R V Road and Bommasandra) were floated in 3 packages. On 9 December 2016, BMRC floated tenders for the construction of 6.418 km stretch from Bommasandra to Hosa Road station. The work involves construction of viaduct with five stations and includes construction of the depot entry line leading to Hebbagodi depot. Tenders for the 6.385 km stretch from Hosa Road to Bommanahalli (previously HSR Layout) were floated the next day. Both packages were awarded to Thai-based ITD Cementation India in May 2017 for ₹511.35 and 485.52 crores (US$140 mil totally). Civil works began in November 2017.

Funding
For Phase-2 of Namma Metro, the Central and State Governments will fund around ₹15,000 crore. The State and Central Governments will bear 30% and 20% of the project cost respectively. The remaining will be obtained through senior term loans. BMRCL is permitted to raise up to ₹9,000 crore through loans.

Indian firms Biocon and Infosys announced that they would provide funding construction of the Hebbagodi and Konappana Agrahara (now renamed 'Infosys Foundation Konappana Agrahara') metro stations respectively on the Yellow Line. Each firm will contribute  towards the project. Biocon CMD Kiran Mazumdar Shaw stated that the company wanted to fund the project because it would help de-congest the city. Both Biocon and Infosys have offices located near the stations.

Infrastructure

Rolling stock
BMRC plans to operate driverless trains on the Yellow Line with Communication Based Train Control (CBTC) signaling system. On 2 December 2019, BMRC awarded a contract for supplying 90 coaches (15 rakes) to CRRC Nanjing Puzhen Co.Ltd with CBTC signaling for the Yellow Line.

The contract for construction of Hebbagodi depot was awarded to Parnika Commercial & Estates(P) Ltd in July 2019.

Stations
The Yellow Line is fully elevated and will have 16 stations.

See also 

 Namma Metro
 Purple Line
 Green Line
 Pink Line
 Blue Line
 Orange Line
 List of Namma Metro Stations
 Rapid transit in India
 List of metro systems

References

Namma Metro lines